is a terminal railway station in Inabe, Mie Prefecture, Japan. It is located 26.5 rail kilometres from the opposing terminus of the Sangi Line at Kintetsu-Tomida Station.

Lines
Sangi Railway
Sangi Line

Layout
Nishi-Fujiwara Station has a single island platform; however, one side of the platform is used to display three old locomotives, and is not in use. The station building is designed to resemble a steam locomotive.

Platforms

Adjacent stations

History
Nishi-Fujiwara Station was opened on December 23, 1931. A new station building was completed in July 2002.

External links

Sangi Railway official home page

Railway stations in Japan opened in 1931
Railway stations in Mie Prefecture